Imparfinis is a genus of three-barbeled catfishes native to South America, with a single species (I. lineatus) in Central America.

Species
There are currently 23 recognized species in this genus:
 Imparfinis borodini Mees & Cala, 1989
 Imparfinis cochabambae (Fowler, 1940)
 Imparfinis guttatus (N. E. Pearson, 1924)
 Imparfinis hasemani Steindachner, 1915
 Imparfinis hollandi Haseman, 1911
 Imparfinis lineatus (W. A. Bussing, 1970)
 Imparfinis longicaudus (Boulenger, 1887)
 Imparfinis microps C. H. Eigenmann & Fisher, 1916
 Imparfinis minutus (Lütken, 1874)
 Imparfinis mirini Haseman, 1911
 Imparfinis mishky Almirón, Casciotta, Bechara, Ruiz Díaz, Bruno, D'Ambrosio, Solimano & Soneiro, 2007
Imparfinis munduruku 
 Imparfinis nemacheir (C. H. Eigenmann & Fisher, 1916)
 Imparfinis parvus (Boulenger, 1898)
 Imparfinis pijpersi (Hoedeman, 1961)
 Imparfinis piperatus C. H. Eigenmann & A. A. Norris, 1900
 Imparfinis pristos Mees & Cala, 1989
 Imparfinis pseudonemacheir Mees & Cala, 1989
 Imparfinis schubarti (A. L. Gomes, 1956)
 Imparfinis spurrellii (Regan, 1913)
 Imparfinis stictonotus (Fowler, 1940)
 Imparfinis timana Ortega-Lara, Milani, DoNascimiento, Villa-Navarro & Maldenado-Ocampo, 2011
 Imparfinis usmai Ortega-Lara, Milani, DoNascimiento, Villa-Navarro & Maldenado-Ocampo, 2011

References

Heptapteridae
Fish of South America
Catfish genera
Taxa named by Carl H. Eigenmann
Freshwater fish genera